Melinda Ann Plowman (born May 13, 1941), also known as Melinda Ann Casey and Melinda Casey, is an American actress and associate director. She began her acting career at age 6 and appeared in feature films and television episodes through the 1960s. In the 1970s, she became a member of the Directors Guild of America and worked as an associate director through the 1990s.

Early life
Melinda Ann Plowman was born on May 13, 1941, in Abilene, Texas. Her parents, Homer Lee Plowman and Lura Frances Slaughter, had met and married in Abilene in 1934. She has one younger sister. Her second birthday party, hosted by her mother and grandmother, was reported in the Abilene Reporter-News.

The family moved to Los Angeles in 1942. Plowman was enrolled in a dance school at age 3. She was "discovered" at the age of 6 through the dancing school and was cast in a bit part in the 1949 film Little Women.

Career

Acting
Plowman acted in Hollywood films in the 1950s but primarily worked in television. She appeared in seven NBC Matinee Theater episodes, as well as episodes of Ford Theatre, The Loretta Young Show, and The George Burns and Gracie Allen Show. She was one of the original Mouseketeers on The Mickey Mouse Club.

Her parents preferred to maintain her status as a freelance actor rather than a studio contract player. Her mother accompanied her on the set. When she wasn't working, Plowman attended a public elementary school and, later, San Marino High School in San Marino, California. During film shoots, she had a private tutor on the set.

Plowman landed her first leading role at the age of 25 in the 1966 horror film Billy the Kid Versus Dracula.

Directing
In the 1970s, she joined the Directors Guild of America, listing herself as an associate director under the name Melinda Ann Casey. She continued working on film crews through the 1990s.

Personal life
Plowman married Phil Casey, a talent manager, in Las Vegas in August 1967. They had one son. Plowman later married Robert Ballew, with whom she has a daughter. In 1971, her parents moved back to Fort Worth. She lives in Victoria, British Columbia.

Filmography (as an actress)

References

Sources

External links

 
 

1941 births
Living people
American film actresses
American television actresses
Actresses from Texas
People from Taylor, Texas
20th-century American actresses